Eleanor "El" Hardwick (born 1993) is a non-binary British photographer, director, curator, musician and multidisciplinary artist. They perform under the moniker Moonbow.  El, their sister Rachel, and Chrissie White collaborated in 2016 on a self-published photography book, Celestial bodies.  El have been interviewed by and featured in such publications as The Independent, The Guardian, and British Vogue, and have exhibited at such galleries as the Victoria and Albert Museum, the Southbank Centre, and The Cob Gallery.

References 

Queer musicians
1993 births
Living people
Non-binary musicians